Stara Kuźnia  is a village in the administrative district of Gmina Bierawa, within Kędzierzyn-Koźle County, Opole Voivodeship, in south-western Poland.

The village has a population of 691.

During the Second World War the village, then known as Klein Althammer, was the base for a working party (E537) of British and Commonwealth prisoners of war, under the administration of Stalag VIIIB/344 at Łambinowice (then known as Lamsdorf) in Poland. In January 1945, as the Soviet armies resumed their offensive and advanced into Germany, the prisoners were marched westward in the so-called Long March or Death March. Many of them died from the bitter cold and exhaustion. The lucky ones got far enough to the west to be liberated by the allied armies after some four months of travelling on foot in appalling conditions.

Gallery

References

Villages in Kędzierzyn-Koźle County